Kerknet (launched 2007) is the web portal of the Catholic Church in Flanders, Belgium. It is run by a non-profit of the same name (Kerknet vzw), as well as having an associated YouTube Channel and Twitter profile. In May 2012 the site was subject to a series of DDOS attacks seeking to "silence the Church". On 18 February 2015 the site was relaunched as a web portal.

External links
 
 
 Kerknet YouTube Channel

References

Web portals
Belgian websites
Catholic Church in Belgium